George S. Sexton, III is an American designer, specializing in the areas of lighting design, museum design and museum planning services.

Life
Sexton studied at Virginia Polytechnic Institute and State University from 1966, where he received his Bachelor of Architecture Degree in 1971. Upon graduation, Sexton began his work in architectural lighting design through his employment at Claude Engle, Lighting Consultant in Washington, DC.  He continued his work in the field of lighting design by taking a position at the National Gallery of Art both designing and lighting exhibits.  This early professional experience working in DC museums coupled with his modernist training as an architect have been the foundations of his approach to lighting and museum design.  Further shaping experiences include working as Acting Keeper of the Sainsbury Centre for Visual Arts in Norwich, England, as well as the Head of the Design and Installation Department for the Fine Arts Museums of San Francisco at both the M.H. de Young Memorial Museum and the California Palace of the Legion of Honor.

In 1980, Sexton opened his own lighting and museum design firm, George Sexton Associates, based in Washington, DC, with satellite offices in Norwich, England and New York City.

Connection to Claude Engle
Trained in architecture at Virginia Polytechnic Institute, George Sexton found himself - after graduation, amid a recession in the early 1970s — seeking employment beyond architecture firms and found a position with lighting designer Claude Engle. Assigned to the east wing extension for the National Gallery of Art in Washington, D.C., which Engle was working on at the time, was what set Sexton on a course of museum work that has been the cornerstone of his professional lighting career.

Lighting philosophy
As referenced in an interview of George Sexton, "Design-wise, it's about listening to the client. In terms of lighting, we are of the school that you shouldn't notice our work; it should be transparent. ... Daylight is very important to the visitor's experience. Architects and lighting designers have a great comfort level in working with daylight. It is something that can be managed in a way that is consistent with museums, but when making that choice, there is a cost of controlling daylight that needs to be considered. ... Regarding technology impacting museum lighting, there's a whole area of lighting controls, particularly as they relate to conservation and energy issues. Interactive media as well. We need to be clever as designers and consider these other sources (i.e., the whole range of media generated light) as part of the lighting solution."

Projects of note

Sexton has provided design services for an array of international and domestic clients, including the following:

Museums and galleries
 Museum of Modern Art, New York City
 Museum of Fine Arts, Boston
 Morse Museum of American Art, Winter Park Florida
 Star-Spangled Banner Exhibit, National Museum of American History Washington DC
 Victoria & Albert Museum, London UK
 Peabody Essex Museum, Salem Massachusetts
 Modern Art Museum of Fort Worth
 Sainsbury Centre for Visual Arts, University of East Anglia, Norwich, England
 Denver Art Museum
 Asian Art Museum of San Francisco
 National Gallery of Australia in Canberra, Australia
 Metropolitan Museum of American Art Henry R. Luce Center for the Study of American Art in New York City
 The Dali Museum, St. Petersburg Florida
 Geoffrey Diner Gallery, Masterpiece London (Awarded Stand of the Year 2013)]
 Dulwich Picture Gallery, London UK
 National Portrait Gallery, Washington DC
Public & Civic
 Flight 93 Memorial, Somerset Pennsylvania
 Vietnam Veterans Memorial, Washington, DC
 Parliament Houses in Canberra, Australia
 DiMenna Center for Classical Music, New York City
 Robert and Arlene Kogod Courtyard, Smithsonian Institution Washington DC
 National Dance Institute, New York City
 National Botanical Garden of Wales, Middleton Wales

Offices and mixed use
 The Shard, London UK
 BMCE Headquarters, Morocco
 Hearst Tower New York
 UBS Ultra High Net Worth Client Offices, Chicago Illinois and Atlanta Georgia
 1100 First Street North East, Washington DC

Commercial
 Shore Club, Miami Beach
 Bryant Park Hotel, New York City
 The Modern, Museum of Modern Art, New York
 tangysweet, Washington DC
 The Hamilton, Washington DC

Retail
 Louis Vuitton stores worldwide
 Elie Tahari, Bal Harbour and Boca Raton Florida
 TAG Heuer, Peking Road Hong Kong

Residential
 Private residences worldwide
 Oyster House, Honest Point (Northern Neck) Virginia

Worship
 St. Joseph Cathedral, Sioux Falls South Dakota
 Herz Jesu Kirche, Munich Germany
 Shrine of Our Lady of Guadalupe, La Crosse Wisconsin
 Basilica of the Assumption, Baltimore Maryland

Awards
French Pavilion, International Expo 2010, Shanghai China
 IIDA Section Guth Illumination Design Award, 2011

Museum of Fine Arts, Boston, Boston Massachusetts
 IIDA Section Guth Illumination Design Award, 2011

22 Bateman's Row, London UK
 RIBA London Building of the Year, 2010

1100 First Street NE, Washington DC
 A|L Light & Architecture Commendable Achievement in Interior Lighting, 2010
 E Edison Award of Excellence, 2009

Goucher College Athenaeum, Towson Maryland
 GE Edison Award of Merit, 2009

Lumen United Reformed Church, London UK
 IIDA Section Guth Illumination Design Award, 2009
 A|L Light & Architecture Commendable Achievement in Architectural Lighting, 2009

Star-Spangled Banner Exhibit, National Museum of American History, Washington DC
 IIDA Section Guth Illumination Design Award, 2009
 A|L Light & Architecture Special Citation for Achievement in Exhibition Lighting, 2009

Robert and Arlene Kogod Courtyard, Smithsonian Institution, Washington DC
 IIDA Guth Illumination Design Award, 2008

National Association of Realtors Headquarters, Washington DC
 U.S. Green Building Council LEED Award, Silver Rating, 2005
 Citation for Sustainable Design Award – Committee on the Environment Boston Society of Architects/AIA and Committee on the Environment of the AIA New York Chapter (in collaboration with Gund Partnership), 2004

Vietnam Veterans Memorial, Washington DC
 International Illumination Design Awards – Waterbury Capital Section Award, 2005

Louis Vuitton, Roppongi Hills, Japan
 GE Edison Award of Merit, 2004]

Cleveland Museum of Art Building Restoration, Cleveland Ohio
 Cleveland Restoration Society and Preservation Resource Center of Northeastern Ohio - Technical Achievement in Preservation Award (in collaboration with Vitetta), 2003

Modern Art Museum of Fort Worth, Fort Worth Texas
 IIDA Edwin F. Guth Memorial Award of Excellence, 2003
 IALD International Association of Lighting Designers Award of Merit, 2003
 IIDA Edwin F. Guth Memorial Award of Excellence for Interior Lighting Design, 2003
 IIDA Capitol Section Illumination Design Award, 2003
 IIDA Capitol Section Illumination Design Award of Merit – International Level, 2003

Milwaukee Art Museum, Milwaukee Wisconsin
 IIDA Paul Waterbury Award of Excellence for Outdoor Lighting Design
 GE Edison Award of Excellence, 2002
 IIDA Capitol Section Illumination Design Award, 2002

Herz Jesu Kirche (Heart of Jesus Church), Munich Germany
 IIDA Edwin F. Guth Memorial Award of Excellence for Interior Lighting Design, 2002
 IIDA Capitol Section Illumination Design Award, 2002
 IALD International Association of Lighting Designers Award of Merit, 2001
 GE Edison Award of Excellence, 2000

Denver Art Museum, Denver Colorado
 IESNA International Illumination Design Award of Merit, 1999

Henry Francis DuPont Winterthur Museum—McIntire Room, Wilmington Delaware
 IESNA Capital Section Illumination Design Award, 1998

References

External links
George Sexton's website
George Sexton Associates website
Interview of George Sexton, published Feb 4 2011

1940s births
Year of birth missing (living people)
Living people
Virginia Tech alumni
American designers
Museum designers
Lighting engineers
American architects